Green Prophet is a website and blog featuring clean technology and eco news. It focuses mainly on topics related to the Middle East.

In 2012, the site was reaching almost 200,000 viewers per month. By 2015, more than 20 journalists and analysts reported for Green Prophet, following social issues related to the environment, in the Middle East-North Africa region.

History
Green Prophet was founded in 2008 by Karin Kloosterman, an environmental activist from Canada, who moved to the Middle East. At first the website focused on environmental news from Israel. Shortly thereafter it began to publish news and feature articles about environmental topics throughout the Middle East, including eco-faith, solar and wind energy, organic living, sustainable housing, oil independence, science and health. Over the years Karin reports being one of the "biggest friends to the enemy states", because she works from Israel, a society with freedom of speech, she is able to write about the atrocities reported to her secretly from people in Iran, Iraq, Egypt, who might "disappear" for social, environmental action.

Green Prophet followed a social experiment in electricity use Masdar City in Abu Dhabi in 2010.

References

External links
 www.greenprophet.com

Environmental blogs
Internet properties established in 2008